Dorino Gattilusio may refer to:

 Dorino I Gattilusio (died 1455), Lord of Lesbos
 Dorino II Gattilusio (died 1488), Lord of Ainos, Samothrace and Imbros

See also

 Gattilusi (family)